The Supervía Poniente (literally "Western Super-Way") is a tollway linking the business district of Santa Fe, Mexico City with the Anillo Periférico beltway in southwestern Mexico City. The final portion opened on June 15, 2013. From Paseo de la Reforma and Mexican Federal Highway 15D just east of the Centro Santa Fe shopping mall, Avenida Carlos Laza begins, which turns into the tollway. The road then crosses Las Águilas, Desierto de los Leones and Avenida Las Torres roads, continuing to Avenida de Los Poetas until Avenida Luis Cabrera and its junction with the Periférico.

References

Highways in Greater Mexico City